Margibi-1 is an electoral district for the elections to the House of Representatives of Liberia. The constituency covers Marshall city as well as eight communities of Mamabah-Kaba District; Loongaye, Karfeah, Garneo, Zoeduehn, Whowein, Scheiffelin Central, Lloydsville Central and Garmaymu.

Elected representatives

References

Electoral districts in Liberia